Cree Hunters of Mistassini is a 1974 documentary film produced by the National Film Board of Canada and co-directed by Boyce Richardson and Tony Ianzelo. It chronicles a group of three Cree families from the Mistassini region of Quebec as they set up a winter hunting camp near James Bay and Ungava Bay. The film explores the beliefs and the ecological principles of the Cree people.

Richardson had previously written a series of articles for the Montreal Star on Native rights and the environmental damage done by development on their land. He traveled to Mistassini to speak with Cree friends, pledging that their film would allow Native people to tell their own stories, and filming went ahead with three hunting families in the bush, over five months from 1972 to 1973.

Awards
BAFTA (British Academy Film Awards), London: BAFTA Award for Best Documentary (Robert Flaherty Award), 1975
Canadian Film Awards, Niagara-on-the-Lake, ON: Genie Award for Best Documentary, 1975
Melbourne Film Festival: Silver Boomerang, Best film made specifically for TV, 1975

References

External links
Watch Cree Hunters of Mistassini at NFB.ca

1974 films
Documentary films about First Nations
National Film Board of Canada documentaries
BAFTA winners (films)
Cree culture
Films directed by Tony Ianzelo
Best Short Documentary Film Genie and Canadian Screen Award winners
Hunting in popular culture
Films about hunter-gatherers
Documentary films about environmental issues
Eeyou Istchee (territory)
1974 documentary films
Anthropology documentary films
Films produced by Colin Low (filmmaker)
Canadian short documentary films
1970s English-language films
1970s Canadian films